Dizzy Gillespie Meets Phil Woods Quintet is an album by trumpeter Dizzy Gillespie with saxophonist Phil Woods Quintet recorded in 1986 and released on the Dutch Timeless label.

Reception
The Allmusic review stated "This European studio session features Dizzy as a special guest sitting in with one of Woods' greatest quintets, with pianist Hal Galper and the brilliant trumpeter and flugelhornist Tom Harrell. In fact Dizzy's chops had already slipped somewhat during the decade and Harrell clearly outplays him even though he clearly isn't trying to embarrass the legendary trumpeter".

Track listing
All compositions by Dizzy Gillespie except as indicated
 "Oon-Ga-Wa" - 6:21
 "Loose Change" (Hal Galper) - 8:06
 "Whasdishean" - 6:01
 "'Round Midnight" (Thelonious Monk) - 12:42
 "Love for Sale" (Cole Porter) - 8:49

Personnel
Dizzy Gillespie - trumpet
Phil Woods - alto saxophone
Hal Galper - piano
Steve Gilmore - bass
Bill Goodwin - drums
Tom Harrell - trumpet, flugelhorn

References 

Timeless Records albums
Dizzy Gillespie albums
Phil Woods albums
1987 albums